The Cambridge Apostles (also known as Conversazione Society) is an intellectual society at the University of Cambridge founded in 1820 by George Tomlinson, a Cambridge student who became the first Bishop of Gibraltar.

The origin of the Apostles' nickname dates from the number, 12, of their founders. Membership consists largely of undergraduates, but there have been graduate students and members who already have held university and college posts. The society traditionally drew most of its members from Christ's, St John's, Jesus, Trinity and King's Colleges.

Activities and membership

The society is essentially a discussion group. Meetings are held once per week, traditionally on Saturday evenings, during which one member gives a prepared talk on a topic, which is later thrown open for discussion.

The usual procedure was for members to meet at the rooms of those whose turn it was to present the topic. The host would provide refreshments consisting of coffee and sardines on toast, called "whales". Women first gained acceptance into the society in the 1970s.

The Apostles retain a leather diary of their membership ("the book") stretching back to its founder, which includes handwritten notes about the topics on which each member has spoken. It is included in the so-called Ark, which is a cedar chest containing collection of papers with some handwritten notes from the group's early days, about the topics members have discussed, and the results of the division in which those present voted on the debate. It was a point of honour that the question voted on should bear only a tangential relationship to the matter debated. The members referred to as the Apostles are the active, usually undergraduate members; former members are called angels. Undergraduates apply to become angels after graduating or being awarded a fellowship. Every few years, amid great secrecy, all the angels are invited to an Apostles' dinner at a Cambridge college. There used to be an annual dinner, usually held in London.

Undergraduates being considered for membership are called embryos and are invited to embryo parties, where members judge whether the student should be invited to join. The embryos attend these parties without knowing they are being considered for membership. Becoming an Apostle involves taking an oath of secrecy and listening to the reading of a curse, originally written by Apostle Fenton John Anthony Hort, the theologian, in or around 1851.

Former members have spoken of the lifelong bond they feel toward one another. Henry Sidgwick, the philosopher, wrote of the Apostles in his memoirs that "the tie of attachment to this society is much the strongest corporate bond which I have known in my life."

Alfred Tennyson joined the Apostles in 1829, probably through the invitation of his friend Arthur Hallam. Bertrand Russell and G. E. Moore joined as students, as did John Maynard Keynes, who invited Ludwig Wittgenstein to join. Russell had been worried that Wittgenstein would not appreciate the group's unseriousness and style of humour. He was admitted in 1912 but resigned almost immediately because he could not tolerate the level of the discussion on the Hearth Rug (he also had trouble tolerating the discussions in the Moral Sciences Club). He rejoined in the 1920s when he returned to Cambridge.

References

Bibliography 

 
 
 

1820 establishments in England
Apostles
Collegiate secret societies
Student organizations established in 1820